Christian observance of Passover is found among Assemblies of Yahweh, Messianic Jews, and some congregations of the Church of God (Seventh Day). It is often linked to the Christian holiday and festival of Easter. Often, only an abbreviated seder is celebrated to explain the meaning in a time-limited ceremony. The redemption from the bondage of sin through the sacrifice of Christ is celebrated, a parallel of the Jewish Passover's celebration of redemption from bondage in the land of Egypt. Usually, Christians that participate in a Jewish Passover Seder ceremony do so with a Messianic Haggadah, a text, booklet, or video that walks participants through the "order" of the Passover Seder.

Christian Passover ceremonies are held on the evening corresponding to 14 Nisan or 15 Nisan, depending whether the particular church uses a quartodeciman or quintodeciman application. In other cases, the holiday is observed according to the Hebrew calendar on 15 Nisan, which is also used by Samaritans.

Meaning
According to Chosen People Ministries, Passover, as observed by ancient Israel as well as Jews today, was a type of the true Passover sacrifice that was to be made by Jesus.

Celebrations 

Many Adventist, Sabbatarian Churches of God, Messianic Jews, Jehovah's Witnesses (who call it the 'Memorial of Christ's Death') and other groups observe a Christian Passover — although all do not agree on the date(s) or the related practices.

Among those Christians who observe Passover there are some differences in how it is done. Some Christians celebrate Passover as the Jews celebrate it. They roast and eat lamb, bitter herbs, and unleavened matzo. Others follow the instructions that Jesus gave to his disciples at the Last Supper before he was crucified, and share bread (usually unleavened) and wine instead of roasted lamb. In some traditions, the ceremony is combined with washing one another's feet, as Jesus did for his disciples the night that he suffered.

Saint Thomas Christians (Nazranis) in the Malabar coast of India (Kerala) have a customary celebration of Pesaha (Passover) at their homes. On the evening before Good Friday (called Pesaha Vyazham or Pesaha Thursday) the Pesaha bread (also called Pesaha appam) is made at home. It is made with unleavened flour mixed with certain herbs and condiments and they use a sweet thick drink made up of coconut milk and jaggery along with this bread (can be compared to charoset of the Jewish seder). On the Pesaha night the bread is baked or steamed in a new vessel, immediately after the flour is mixed with water and pierced many times with handle of the spoon to let out the steam so that the bread will not rise (this custom is called juthante kannu kuthal in the Malayalam language. This bread is cut by the head of the family and shared among the family members after scripture reading from the Book of Exodus narrating the Passover incidence, and prayers, by traditionally dipping it in the charoset-like drink, used along with the Pesaha bread. The Pesaha bread, especially the first baked bread of the lot, is not shared with non-Nazranis. If the family is in mourning following a death, Pesaha bread is not made at their home, but some Syrian Christian neighbours share their bread with them. The Pesaha tradition may have its origin in their likely Jewish ancestry since they are Christians whose roots can be traced back to the first century AD apostolic missions in Persia and India.

Date 
Some differences between when groups observe Passover are:
 Disputes over when a day begins. The modern western day begins at midnight (12:00 A.M.), whereas the biblical day begins at sunset.
 Disputes over which day Jesus was crucified on. (John nowhere identifies the Last Supper as a Passover meal, and John 18:28 has the priests preparing to eat the Passover meal in the morning after the Last Supper.) According to many other interpretations of the Synoptic Gospels, it was the day of Passover, Nisan 15.
 Some Christians observe the celebration on the day before Passover, at the same time that Jesus held his Last Supper, while others observe it at the same time as the Passover sacrifice, that is, the time of Jesus' death, which occurred or approximately 3:00 o'clock.
 Still others celebrate it after sunset, at which time it would be the 15th of Nisan, the time in which the Israelites ate the Passover meal (for example see ).
 Some Christians, out of deference for traditional gentile Easter dates, choose to celebrate Passover, or hold Seders, on the Thursday before Easter, known as Maundy Thursday, or the Last Supper observance. These dates vary among Hebrew, Gregorian, and Julian calendars, and they vary between Western (e.g. Roman Catholic) and Eastern Orthodox (e.g. Greek Orthodox) traditions.

Replacement by Easter

According to the Catholic Encyclopedia Passover was taken over into the Christian Easter celebration.

Melito's Peri Pascha ("On the Passover") is perhaps the most famous early document concerning the Christian non-observation of Passover.

Apollinaris wrote:

Jewish reactions 
Jews have cited Christian seders as a form of cultural appropriation, among other criticisms.

See also

Christian observances of Jewish holidays
Christian views on the Old Covenant
Lord's Day
Radical reformation
Sabbatarianism

References

Further reading
 Edward Chumney. The Seven Festivals of the Messiah. Treasure House, 1994. 
 Howard, Kevin. The Feasts Of The Lord God's Prophetic Calendar From Calvary To The Kingdom. Nelson Books, 1997. 
 

Christian festivals and holy days
Christian terminology
Cultural appropriation